Thereva handlirschi  is a Palearctic species of stiletto fly in the family Therevidae.

References

External links
Images representing  Thereva handlirschi

Therevidae
Insects described in 1912
Taxa named by Otto Kröber